Dom Joseph I (6 June 1714 – 24 February 1777), known as the Reformer (Portuguese: o Reformador), was King of Portugal from 31 July 1750 until his death in 1777. Among other activities, Joseph was devoted to hunting and the opera. Indeed, he assembled one of the greatest collections of operatic scores in Europe. His government was controlled by Sebastião José de Carvalho e Melo, 1st Marquis of Pombal.

The third child and second son of King Dom John V, Joseph became his father's heir as an infant when his older brother, Dom Pedro, Prince of Brazil, died. In 1729 he married Infanta Mariana Victoria, the eldest daughter of King Don Philip V of Spain, and Joseph's sister Infanta Barbara married Mariana Victoria's half-brother Prince Don Ferdinand (the future King Don Ferdinand VI of Spain). These marriages were known as the Exchange of the Princesses. Joseph and Mariana Victoria had four daughters. 

With the death of his father in 1750, Joseph became king of Portugal. His reign witnessed, among other things, a deadly earthquake in Lisbon in 1755 and a Spanish-French invasion of Portugal in 1762. The Lisbon earthquake allowed the Marquis of Pombal to consolidate power and also caused King Joseph to develop claustrophobia, refusing to live in a walled building ever again. Afterwards, Joseph moved his court into a series of tents. A new palace was built for him in Lisbon in the aftermath of the earthquake, but this was left uncompleted. Joseph died in 1777 and was succeeded by his eldest daughter, Queen Dona Maria I.

Early life
Joseph was the third child of King Dom John V of Portugal and his wife Maria Anna of Austria. He had an older brother Dom Pedro, Prince of Brazil, an older sister Barbara and three younger brothers. When his brother Pedro died in 1714 at the age of two, Joseph became heir apparent with the titles of Prince of Brazil and Duke of Braganza.

Marriage

On 19 January 1729, Joseph married Infanta Mariana Victoria of Spain, daughter of King Don Philip V of Spain and Elisabeth Farnese, and his elder sister Barbara married King Philip's son and heir, Don Ferdinand, Prince of Asturias (later King Don Ferdinand VI of Spain). The ceremony became known as the Exchange of the Princesses. Mariana Victoria loved music and hunting, just like her husband, but she was also a serious woman who disapproved of Joseph's love affairs and did not hesitate to expose them to acquaintances. They had four daughters, all born before Joseph ascended the throne.

Reign 

Joseph succeeded to the Portuguese throne in 1750, when he was 36 years old, and almost immediately placed effective power in the hands of Sebastião José de Carvalho e Melo (in 1770, the king made him Marquis of Pombal). Indeed, the history of Joseph's reign is really that of the Marquis of Pombal himself. The king's eldest daughter, Maria Francisca, became heir presumptive with the title of Princess of Brazil.

Victory over Spain and France (1762)

One of the most difficult situations faced by the king was the Franco-Spanish invasion of Portugal, in the end of the Seven Years' War (5 May-24 November 1762). France and Spain sent an ultimatum in order to force Portugal to abandon its alliance with Great Britain and close her ports to British ships. King Joseph refused to submit and asked for British help since both Portugal and its army were in a very poor condition, mainly because of the great 1755 Lisbon earthquake. England sent a force of 7,104 men led by John Campbell, 4th Earl of Loudoun, and John Burgoyne, and also the exceptional military leader William, Count of Schaumburg-Lippe, which reformed the Portuguese army and led the allied army of 14-15,000 men in a victorious war. The Bourbon invaders first led by Nicolás de Carvajal, Marquis of Sarriá, and then by Pedro Pablo Abarca de Bolea, Count of Aranda, were thrice defeated by a combination of popular uprising, scorched earth strategy/famine and encircling movements by the regular Anglo-Portuguese troops, which like the militia, skilfully used the mountainous terrain to their advantage. The Spanish and French troops suffered staggering losses when they were driven out from Portugal and chased into Spain. As synthesized by historian Walter Dorn:

In South America, the war ended in a draw; the Portuguese took territory from Spain (most of the Rio Negro Valley) and defeated a Spanish invasion of Mato Grosso, while Spain conquered Colónia do Sacramento and the vast territory of Rio Grande do Sul (1763). The Treaty of Paris (1763) restored the status quo ante bellum. The rich and huge territory of Rio Grande do Sul would be retaken from the Spanish army during the undeclared war of 1763-1777.

Marquis of Pombal 
The powerful Marquis of Pombal sought to overhaul all aspects of economic, social and colonial policy to make Portugal a more efficient contender with the other great powers of Europe, and thus enhance his own political stature. A supposed conspiracy of nobles aimed at murdering King Joseph and Pombal gave him the opportunity (some say the pretext) to neutralize the Távora family in the Távora affair and to expel the Jesuits in September 1759, thus gaining control of public education and a wealth of church lands and ushering Portugal into the Age of the Enlightenment.

Legacy and death 
Joseph's reign is also noteworthy for the Lisbon earthquake, firestorm and tsunami of 1 November 1755, in which between 30,000 and 40,000 people died. The earthquake caused Joseph to develop a severe case of claustrophobia, and he was never again comfortable living within a walled building. Consequently, he moved the royal court to an extensive complex of tents in the hills of Ajuda. 

The Project for the Royal Palace in Campo de Ourique was an ambitious palatial complex planned for the Campo de Ourique neighborhood of Lisbon, but later abandoned due to a lack of impetus from the Portuguese royal family and a prioritization of other reconstruction efforts. The capital was eventually rebuilt at great cost, and an equestrian statue of King Joseph still dominates the Praça do Comércio, Lisbon's main plaza.

With Joseph's death on 24 February 1777, the throne passed to his daughter, Queen Dona Maria I, and his brother and son-in-law, King Dom Peter III. Pombal's iron rule was sharply brought to an end, because Maria disliked him since she had been heavily influenced by the Portuguese old nobility that strongly opposed Pombal.

Issue

Joseph I fathered four daughters by his wife Mariana Victoria, and there were also four stillbirths. Of their four daughters, only the eldest had issue:

Maria Francisca Isabel Rita Gertrudes Joanna (17 December 1734 – 20 March 1816), married her uncle Infante Peter of Portugal, with issue. After her father's death, she became the first queen regnant of Portugal as Dona Maria I.
Maria Ana Francisca Dorotea Josefa Antonia Gertrudes Rita Joanna Efigenia (7 October 1736 – 6 May 1813), potential bride for Louis, Dauphin of France, son and heir of King Louis XV. However, Maria Ana's mother refused to consent to the marriage, and the infanta died unmarried.
Stillborn son (February 1739).
Maria Francisca Doroteia Josefa Antónia Gertrudes Rita Joanna Efigénia de Braganca (21 September 1739 – 14 January 1771), potential bride for the French nobleman and revolutionary Philippe Égalité, but she refused to marry him and died unmarried.
Stillborn daughter (7 March 1742).
Stillborn daughter (15 October 1742).
Stillborn daughter (May 1744).
Maria Francisca Benedita Ana Isabel Joanna Antonia Laurencia Inacia Teresa Gertrudes Rita Rosa (25 July 1746 – 18 August 1829) married her nephew Dom Joseph, Prince of Brazil, no issue.

Ancestors

References 

1714 births
1777 deaths
18th-century Portuguese monarchs
Burials at the Monastery of São Vicente de Fora
House of Braganza
Dukes of Braganza
Portuguese infantes
Princes of Brazil
People from Lisbon